Filatima djakovica is a moth of the family Gelechiidae. It is found in southern and central Russia, Ukraine and Romania.

The wingspan is about 17 mm. The forewings are dark brown, with markings formed by black scales with red-brown encircling on the longitudinal axis of the wing. The hindwings are dark grey.

Etymology
The species is named for the type locality, the Dyakovsky Nature Reserve in the Saratov Province of Russia.

References

Moths described in 1996
Filatima